Lapparentophiidae (meaning "Lapparent's snakes") are an extinct family of basal terrestrial ophidians known from Early-Late Cretaceous (?Albian-Cenomanian)-aged fossil remains discovered in Algeria, France, Morocco and Sudan. Two genera are known: the type species, Lapparentophis and the poorly represented genus Pouitella.

They were initially believed to have been snakes, but later studied have found Lapparentophiidae to fall under Ophidia, the clade which Serpentes also belongs to.

References

Prehistoric reptile families
Albian first appearances
Squamata